Falch is a surname. Notable people with the surname include:

Anton Falch (1860–1936), American baseball player
Aslak Falch (born 1992), Norwegian footballer
Edgar Falch (1930–2013), Norwegian footballer
Frank Meidell Falch (1920–2013), Norwegian media director
Michael Falch (born 1956), Danish singer, guitarist, actor, and author
Oswald Falch (1884–1977), Norwegian gymnast
Ulrikke Falch (born 1996), Norwegian actress and author